Galium obliquum is a species of plants in the Rubiaceae. It is native to the Alps along the border between France and Italy, and as far south as Tuscany and as far west as Tarn-et-Garonne.

Galium obliquum is an erect herb with thin stems, narrow leaves (as many as 10 per node) and white or pale yellow flowers.

References

External links
Tela Botanica, Gaillet jaunâtre
Besançon, Galium obliquum

obliquum
Flora of Italy
Flora of France
Flora of the Alps
Plants described in 1779